Relevant Radio (corporate name Relevant Radio, Inc.) is a radio network in the United States, mainly broadcasting talk radio and religious programming involving the Catholic Church. It is the largest Catholic radio network by owned station base. Relevant Radio operates an English language network and a Spanish language network. Its English-language network has 94 owned and operated stations and 75 affiliates, while its Spanish-language network has 7 owned and operated stations. The network originates from studios in Green Bay, Wisconsin, with additional studios in Minneapolis, Minnesota; Madison, Wisconsin; Chicago, Illinois; Austin, Texas; and Newark, New Jersey.

The network airs a variety of programming aimed at practicing Catholics, mostly in a listener-interactive talk format. "Morning Air", which the network describes as "a classic drive-time format that combines inspiration & entertainment" was the first program developed by Relevant Radio in 2003. The network now airs almost exclusive programming developed internally, which also is available to stream live or by podcast on a free mobile app.

History
The network was founded by a group of Catholic businessmen, including Bob Atwell and John Cavil (who founded WJOK in 2000) and Mark Follett, who had been the owner of Anchor Foods, an Appleton-based distributor of frozen appetizers. Starboard Media Foundation, Inc. bought the license to a radio station in Kaukauna, Wisconsin, that had been carrying all-sports programming, and turned it into an all-Catholic station, saying the call letters stood for "Jesus Our King". The station received its license from the FCC on December 12, 2000, the Feast of Our Lady of Guadalupe, who is the patron saint of Relevant Radio along with Pope John Paul II.

On October 13, 2016, Relevant Radio announced that it would merge with Loomis, California-based Immaculate Heart Radio, which owned and operated 36 stations in the western United States at the time of the merger. The merger was completed on July 31, 2017, with all stations being licensed to Immaculate Heart Media, Inc., while Relevant Radio continued as the on-air branding. The corporate name was changed to Relevant Radio, Inc. in February 2020.

In 2019, Immaculate Heart Media purchased 13 AM stations and seven translators from Salem Media Group.

In October 2019, Immaculate Heart purchased the 6 radio stations owned by Northern Michigan-based Baraga Broadcasting, as well as assuming the LMA of affiliate station WMQU, which is currently owned by Blarney Stone Broadcasting.
On May 17, 2021, the 5 Spanish-language Relevant Radio stations have switched to the English-language version.

Station list

English language stations

Former Spanish language stations

See also
Sheila Liaugminas

Sources
 "Catholic network calls Green Bay home", Green Bay News-Chronicle, date uncertain, 2004. (Newspaper now defunct)

References

External links
 
 Catholic News Service reports on troubled times at Relevant Radio

American radio networks
Christian mass media companies
Christian radio stations in the United States
Catholic radio stations
Companies based in Green Bay, Wisconsin
2000 establishments in Wisconsin
Radio broadcasting companies of the United States
Relevant Radio stations